The 2015 Wrestling World Cup – Men's Greco-Roman  was the first of a set of three FILA Wrestling World Cups in 2015. The event took place in Tehran, Iran at Azadi Indoor Stadium February 19 and 20, 2015.

Pool stage

Pool A

Pool B

{| class="wikitable outercollapse"
! POOL B
|-
| Round I

|-
| Round II

Medal Matches

Final classement

See also
2015 Wrestling World Cup - Men's freestyle

References

2015 Wrestling World Cup
2015 in Iranian sport
International wrestling competitions hosted by Iran